Aleksander Słuszka (1580–1647) of Clan Ostoja was a Polish–Lithuanian Commonwealth noble and politician. Starost of Rzeczyca (Rechytsa), Homel (Gomel), Mazyr (Mozyr) and Łojów (Loyew). Castellan of Minsk (1626). Voivode of Minsk (1635), Voivode of Nowogródek (Navahrudak) (1636), Voivode of Troki (Trakai) (1642–1647). Marshal of the Lithuanian Tribunal in 1631.

Raised in a Calvinist family, in 1621 he and his wife converted to Roman Catholicism. From then on, a devout Catholic, he funded two monasteries and two churches.

References

Bibliography
 Urzędnicy Wielkiego Księstwa Litewskiego, t. 2, Województwo trockie XIV-XVIII wiek, pod redakcją Andrzeja Rachuby, Warszawa 2009, s. 651.
 Artur Walden, Marszałkowie świeccy Trybunału Głównego Wielkiego Księstwa Litewskiego w latach 1633–1648, w: Czasopismo Prawno-Historyczne, t. LXV, 2013, z. 1, s. 169.
 http://www.bilp.uw.edu.pl/ti/1861/foto/nn59.htm Tygodnik Ilustrowany, 1861
 Herbarz Kaspra Niesieckiego, s.414
 Volumina Legum, t. 3, Petersburg 1859, s. 277.
 Volumina Legum, t. III, Petersburg 1859, s. 377.
 Volumina Legum, t. III, Petersburg 1859, s. 398.
 Suffragia Woiewodztw y Ziem Koronnych, y W. X. Litewskiego, Zgodnie ná Naiásnieyssego Władisława Zygmunta ... roku 1632 ... Woiewodztwo Krákowskie., [b.n.s.]

See also 

 Ostoja coat of arms
 Clan of Ostoja

Sluszka
Clan of Ostoja
1580 births
1647 deaths
Voivodes of Trakai
Voivodes of Minsk